The Ryan M-1 was a mail plane produced in the United States in the 1920s, the first original design built by Ryan. It was a conventional gear parasol-wing monoplane with two open cockpits in tandem and fixed, tailskid undercarriage.

Design and development
The follow-on M-2 was substantially the same as the M-1. The prototype M-1 was originally powered by a Hispano-Suiza 8A, but production examples featured a variety of engines in the same general power range, with the Wright J-4B chosen for nine of the sixteen M-1s built, and the prototype later refitted with this engine.

Operational history
A M-1 was flown in the 1926 Ford National Reliability Air Tour.

Pacific Air Transport operated J-4B-powered M-1s and M-2s on their demanding Seattle–San Francisco–Los Angeles mail route, while Hispano-Suiza-powered machines flew with Colorado Airways between Cheyenne and Pueblo and Yukon Airways between Whitehorse and Dawson City.

One M-2 (named Bluebird) was built with a fully enclosed cabin for the pilot and four passengers, foreshadowing Ryan's highly successful Brougham series. 
The standard M-2, meanwhile, was Charles Lindbergh's first choice for his transatlantic flight. His list of requirements for the aircraft soon made it apparent, however, that rather than modifying an M-2, it would be more effective to build an all-new design along the same general lines, which resulted in the Ryan NYP Spirit of St Louis.

Operators

 Pacific Air Transport

Aircraft on display
The M-1 prototype was restored to flying condition between 1980 and 1984 and is preserved in the Museum of Flight in Seattle. The seventh aircraft is preserved in airworthy condition in Pacific Air Transport markings at the Historic Aircraft Restoration Museum at Creve Coeur airport, Missouri. A replica of an M-1 using a small number of parts from serial number 11 was built by Andy King in 2001, powered by a Lycoming R-680 and also painted in Pacific Air Transport #7's scheme. Serial number 11 is owned and faces a full restoration by John Norman, who crafted the most accurate reproduction of the Spirit of St. Louis ever built. A replica M-1 is exhibited in the San Diego Air & Space Museum.

Specifications (M-1)

References

Notes

Bibliography

 Hall, Donald A. "Technical Preparation of the Airplane 'Spirit of St Louis'." www.charleslindbergh.com, July 1927. Retrieved: 3 March 2009.
  The Illustrated Encyclopedia of Aircraft. London: Aerospace Publishing, 1985.
 Munson, Kenneth. Airliners from 1919 to the Present Day. London: Peerage Books, 1982. .
 Museum of Flight News, January/February 1991.
  Ogden, Bob. Aviation Museums and Collections of North America. Tunbridge Wells, Kent, UK: Air-Britain (Historians) Ltd.,  2007. .
 "Ryan M-1." The Museum of Flight. Retrieved: 3 March 2009.
 "Ryan, Ryan-Douglas, Ryan-Flamingo, Ryan-Standard". Aerofiles. Retrieved: 3 March 2009.
 "Collection."  San Diego Air & Space Museum. Retrieved: 3 March 2009.
 Taylor, Michael J.H. Jane's Encyclopedia of Aviation. London: Studio Editions, 1989. .

External links

 Ryan M-1 - Holcomb's Aerodrome
 Dawn Patrol Aviation- Ryan M-1 archive

1920s United States mailplanes
M-1
High-wing aircraft
Single-engined tractor aircraft
Aircraft first flown in 1926